Twin Tower is a 1970s Hong Kong public housing residential block design. In plan, the blocks look like two hollow squares joined at one corner of each square. Each block comprises two "towers" of different heights, although their shapes are the same. The high tower ranges from 24 to 28 stories while the low tower is 21 stories. The size of a typical flat is 36 to 46 m2. It cannot support more than 5 people in a typical flat.

The units in Twin Tower blocks are self-contained flats, each with a kitchen, toilet, and balcony.

The first Twin Tower blocks appeared at Wah Fu Estate. They were suited to the steeply sloping site, as one of the two "towers" within each block is offset by three storeys from the other, providing ground level entrances at multiple points along the slope. The two central atria in each block measure 50 by 50 feet. Reportedly, the square shape of the twin tower design provided the structural stability necessary to build more floors than the earlier, narrower slab blocks.

The Twin Tower blocks at Wah Fu make use of load-bearing partition walls which make construction faster through standardisation, obviate the need for interior columns within flats, and improve structural wind resistance.

After their introduction at Wah Fu Estate, the Twin Tower design appeared at Oi Man Estate and then many other public estates across Hong Kong in the 1970s.

List of blocks

References

External links

 Twin Tower typical floor plan

Public housing in Hong Kong
Architecture in Hong Kong
Twin towers